The 2017 season was the fifth and final season for FC Kansas City, which had competed in the National Women's Soccer League, the top division of women's professional soccer in the United States, since the league's launch in 2013. FC Kansas City folded after the 2017 season and was replaced in the league by a new side owned by Major League Soccer club Real Salt Lake.

Current squad

Head coach
  Vlatko Andonovski (2013–2017)

Results

Preseason

Regular season

References

External links

 

2017 National Women's Soccer League season
2017
American soccer clubs 2017 season
FC Kansas City